Lee Myoung-jin (born 1974) is a South Korean manhwa author and artist. His work Ragnarok was adapted into the game Ragnarok Online by Gravity Corp. This game was later turned into an anime.

History
Lee Myoung-Jin was born in South Korea in 1974 and graduated from Holy Child Catholic School, Seoul with a degree in Visual Design. In 1992 he began work on his first manhwa series, It's Going to be a Wonderful Night, which ran for 4 years (nine volumes) and won him the distinguished Champ Super Manhwa award from Super Champ, South Korea's top manhwa publisher.

In August 1995 he put his artistic career on hold to serve his mandatory two years in the South Korean military. Upon his return, he formed his studio Dive to Dream Sea and began work on Ragnarok (for Champ Comics), one of the top-selling manhwa of all time. Expanding upon his epic fantasy, Myoung-Jin Lee has also become involved in the creation of Ragnarok Online, a game that takes the RPG analogies and rules of his manhwa series to the next level. With concepts taken from his own series, there are multiple players, worlds, and enemies to control, attack, and rule, with character designs and scenes somewhat reminiscent of Final Fantasy. The game is in its finished form and has been distributed in over 100 countries by Korean online game makers Gravity Corp.

In 2004 Ragnarok achieved a new milestone, becoming the first Korean manhwa to inspire a Japanese anime series. Based on the character designs and sensibilities of the online Game, Ragnarok the Animation was given a 26-episode series that was broadcast on TV Tokyo.

Lee's studio, Dive to Dream Sea, also created the 2-volume indie comics comedy manhwa Laya, the Witch of Red Pooh.  Lee also produced a one volume manhwa named Genocide.

See also
 Ragnarok Online
 Ragnarok (manhwa)
 Lights Out (manhwa)

References

South Korean manhwa artists
Living people
1974 births